Alaygirovo (Alayğır) is a rural locality (a village) in Yefremkinsky Selsoviet, Karmaskalinsky District, Bashkortostan, Russia. The population was 468 as of 2010. There are 5 streets.

Geography 
Alaygirovo is located 24 km south of Karmaskaly (the district's administrative centre) by road. Nikiforovka is the nearest rural locality.

References 

Rural localities in Karmaskalinsky District